Kessler's loach (Paraschistura kessleri) is a species of stone loach found in the countries of Iran, Afghanistan and Pakistan.

Footnotes 

Nemacheilidae
Fish of Asia
Fish described in 1889
Taxa named by Albert Günther